Isabel Lydia Whitney (born 1878 in Brooklyn, New York - died 1962) was an American painter and muralist. She was a student of fellow artists Arthur Wesley Dow and Howard Pyle, having studied at the Pratt Institute. Whitney traveled extensively, most prominently in Taos, New Mexico during the 1920s.

In later life she befriended the transgender writer Dawn Langley Simmons, who was then living as a man. While living in Whitney's New York townhouse in the 1950s, Simmons was introduced to Margaret Rutherford and her husband Stringer Davis. Rutherford, interested in meeting Simmons to discuss a role in a possible adaptation of his book ‘’Me Papoose Sitter’’, became enamored with the young author, then in her 20s, and she and Davis agreed to serve as unofficial adoptive parents.[5] Subsequently, Simmons and Whitney purchased a house in Charleston, South Carolina, though Whitney would die two weeks later,[1] leaving Simmons the house and $2 million.[2]

References 
 Isabel Lydia Whitney - AskArt
https://en.wikipedia.org/wiki/Dawn_Langley_Simmons
https://en.wikipedia.org/wiki/Margaret_Rutherford

American muralists
1878 births
1962 deaths
20th-century American painters